Feraday is a surname. Notable people with the surname include:

Caroline Feraday (born 1977), English television and radio presenter
Stephen Feraday (born 1959), Canadian javelin thrower